The Salisbury Football Club, nicknamed the Magpies, is an Australian rules football club based in the northern suburb of Salisbury, South Australia and plays its home games at Salisbury Oval.

History 
The history of football being played in the Salisbury area can date back to the 1870 with a record between a match between two teams from Gawler and a combined team between players from the suburbs of Salisbury and Woodville. The first recorded official match between the Salisbury team and an opponent was on 30 July 1880 against Gawler Albions. Sustaining a secure home ground was quite difficult for Salisbury as drainage and finding suitable grounds were hard problems to come by. The first guernseys for the Salisbury Football Club were made of old wheat sacks with black stripes sewn on.

The Gawler Football League was founded in 1889 with Salisbury a foundation club along with Gawler South, Gawler Central and Willaston. Salisbury won the 1914 minor premiership but lost the grand final to Gawler Central 9.6.60 to 4.7.31. A pavilion was built the year before in 1913 at their new home ground of Salisbury Oval with the help of a local gymnasium club. The 1920s saw a rather unsuccessful era for Salisbury, losing four grand finals to Gawler South. In 1932, the club moved to various different leagues including the North Adelaide District Football Association and the Lower North Football Association until World War II, and gained premiership success in 1937, beating the Virginia Football Club in the grand final. During the war, the club still remained active.

Salisbury moved to the Gawler & District Football League in 1949 and left in 1960, where it enjoyed more premiership success in 1956 and 1957, both against Gawler South who had changed their name to South Gawler and the club adopting the 'Magpies' nickname and wearing the current Collingwood jumper. There was a rather large emphasis on junior football too for the club, and so, the Salisbury Junior Football Club was founded. 1961 was their first season in the newly formed Central Districts Football Association along with Central District, Elizabeth, Elizabeth North, Salisbury North and Two Wells-Virginia. The club won four premierships in a row from 1968 to 1971, with a centenary celebrated in 1980 and the A-Grade team making the decider but unfortunately losing. The name of the league changed to the Northern Metropolitan Football League in the 1980s, along with 1984, 1986 and 1988 senior flags.

The NMFL disbanded in 1994 and Salisbury moved to the Adelaide Footy League where it has remained since. The Magpies have won recent premierships in 1997, 2001 and 2007 and celebrated its 130-year anniversary in 2010. The B-Grade side were back to back premiers in 2016 and the U18s won the same year. Salisbury has also produced a number of Australian Football League players and one AFL Women's player, Stuart Dew (Port Adelaide, Hawthorn), Anthony Ingerson (Adelaide, Melbourne), Scott Bamford (Geelong), Ben Nason (Richmond), Sean Lemmens (Gold Coast Suns) and Sarah Allen (Adelaide).

A-Grade Premierships 
 Lower North Football Association (1): 1937
 Gawler & Districts Football Association (2): 1956, 1957
 Central Districts FA (4): 1968, 1969, 1970, 1971
 Northern Metropolitan FL (3): 1984, 1986, 1988
 South Australian Amateur FL - A7 (2): 1997
 South Australian Amateur Football League - A6 (1): 2001
 Adelaide FL - D4 (1): 2007

References

Other Information 
 

Australian rules football clubs in South Australia
Adelaide Footy League clubs